Miss Chinese International Pageant 2009 was held on January 17, 2009 in Foshan, China.  The pageant is organized and broadcast by TVB in Hong Kong.  Miss Chinese International 2008 Océane Zhu of Paris, France crowned her successor, Christine Kuo of Toronto, Ontario, Canada at the end of the event.

Pageant information
The slogan to this year's pageant is "Beauty • The Continuation of Wonderous Enchantment" 「妍 • 續奇妙風采」.  This year holds the record for most delegates competing, besting the number from 1993 of 27 delegates.  Although, 11 of the delegates this year represent Mainland China excluding the Special Administrative Regions Hong Kong and Macau.  That number alone makes up more than one-third of the total contestant headcount.  The Masters of Ceremonies include Eric Tsang & Derek Li.  Special performing guests were Leo Ku, Miriam Yeung, Bosco Wong, Ron Ng, Corinna Chamberlain, Grace Wong, Carlo Ng, and Bianca Wu.  The five judges in this competition were Susanna Kwan, Gallen Lo, Angel Lau (劉陳小寶), Kevin Cheng, and Siu-Hip Fung (馮少協).

Results

Special awards
Miss Friendship: Skye Chan 陳倩揚 (Hong Kong)
Miss Young: Julie Lam 林玉春 (Tübingen)
Oriental Charm Ambassador Award: Cici Chen 陳娜良子 (Vancouver)
International Charm Ambassador Award: Christine Kuo 苟芸慧 (Toronto)

Swimsuit competition scores

 Winner
 First Runner-up
 Second Runner-up
 Top 5 Finalist
 Top 8 Semifinalist

Contestant list

Notes

Replacements
  – Miss Hong Kong 2008 winner Edelweiss Cheung was replaced by the 1st runner-up, Skye Chan because of her illness.

Crossovers
Contestants who previously competed or will be competing at other international beauty pageants:

Miss World
 2008: : Skye CHAN
Miss International
 2008: : Florence Loi
Miss Tourism Queen International
 2009: : Florence Loi
 2009: : Valentane Huang (Top 20)

External links
 Miss Chinese International Pageant 2009 Official Site

References

TVB
2009 beauty pageants
2009 in China
Beauty pageants in China
Miss Chinese International Pageants